Claudine Gbènagnon Talon (born 1957) is a Beninese public figure, politician, and First Lady of Benin since 6 April 2016, as the wife of Patrice Talon, the President of the Republic of Benin.

Biography
Talon was born Claudine Gbènagnon in 1957 in Porto-Novo. She participates in the politics of Benin through her husband, Patrice Talon, and her foundation. After a lengthy absence, Claudine Talon reappeared publicly on March 26, 2021 shortly before the presidential election.

Charities
The foundation's mission is to improve the living standards of Beninese women and children, as well as increase access to clean drinking water and sanitation facilities for the country's population. It also aims to improve the quality of children's education and empower disadvantaged women.

References

Living people
Date of birth unknown
1957 births
First ladies of Benin
People from Porto-Novo